The Ciujung (Ujung River) is a river in the province of West Java and Banten on the island of Java, Indonesia.

Location

The rivers in Banten, the westernmost province of Java, run roughly parallel to each other.
The main ones are the Peteh, called the Banten on the lower reaches near the city of Kota Banten, the Ujung, which enters the sea at Pontang, the Durian, which enters the sea at Tanara, the Manceuri, and the Sadane, which rises in the mountainous region of Priyangan and in 1682 formed the border between the Dutch East India Company (VOC) territory and Batavia (modern Jakarta).
The rivers fan out into deltas near the coast.
The Ciujung discharges into the  Banten Bay.

The original inhabitants of the mouths of Ci Ujung, Ci Durian and Ci Banten rivers were Sundanese people.
In 1682 there were paddy fields on the lower reaches of the Ujung and Durian.
Pontang port and the Ciujung river used to be important for carrying merchandise into the interior. The river itself sits on an elevation of 10 meters.

See also
List of rivers of Indonesia
List of rivers of Java

References

Sources

 

Rivers of Banten
Rivers of West Java
Rivers of Indonesia